.club, often stylized as .CLUB and sometimes dot-club, is a top-level domain (TLD). It was proposed in ICANN's new generic top-level domain (gTLD) program, and became available to the general public on May 7, 2014. .Club Domains, LLC is the domain name registry for the string.

Acquisition and promotion

In June 2013, .Club Domains, LLC acquired the .club gTLD through a private auction after raising $7 million from 27 individual investors. Colin Campbell, the company's chief executive officer, declined to reveal the final auction price, citing confidentiality agreements. .club was the first new gTLD acquired via private auction. Unsuccessful applicants competing for the gTLD were Donuts and the Merchant Law Group LLP.

Success
According to The Domains, "Those now using a web address ending in .club include brands, celebrities, sports figures, innovative entrepreneurs and startups, associations, and clubs around the globe... tens of thousands of clubs, business and individuals are actively using a .club address for their web presence, from Rotary Clubs, to school clubs, to passionate bloggers." Prominent individuals using the extension include rapper 50 Cent, professional basketball player Tyler Johnson, and Indian cricket star Virat Kohli.

See also

 List of Internet top-level domains

References

External links
 
 .Club Signs Registry Agreement with ICANN by Michae Berkens (November 11, 2013), The Domains
 Canadian-backed .club domains getting snapped up by 50 Cent, Demi Lovato (August 13, 2014), CTV News
 Fort Lauderdale-based domain .club is one of top-selling web newcomers (August 19, 2014), South Florida Business Journal
 From Glee.club to Fight.club: Why one word may be worth millions on the Internet by Rick Spence (November 17, 2014), Financial Post
 How Colin Campbell (Dot Club) Raised $7million in 30 Days by Raymond Hackney (March 9, 2015), The Domains

Computer-related introductions in 2014
Club